Knowledge Park III or Knowledge Park 3 is a sector in south-western Greater Noida, Uttar Pradesh, India. Bordered by Knowledge Park II to the south and Gamma I to the east, it serves numerous private and public institutes, including G.L Bajaj Institute Of Technology and management, Sharda University, Delhi Technical Campus, Dronacharya Group of Institutions and Amity University alongside several skill development training centres.

References 

Geography of Uttar Pradesh